This is a list of mayors of Fort Wayne, Indiana. The mayor is the chief executive of the city, charged with overseeing the operation of all local government departments. Mayoral terms are four years, with no limit on the number of terms an individual may be elected to.

List

Notes
 Baals died of a kidney infection during his fourth term as mayor.
 Moses resigned from office after pleading guilty to three misdemeanor violations of campaign finance laws.
 City Controller Cosette Simon was appointed acting mayor for eleven days following Moses' resignation. She was Fort Wayne's first female mayor.
 With 86 of 99 Allen County Democratic precinct committee members voting in a special caucus for his reinstatement, Moses was elected to complete his second term as mayor.

See also
Mayoral elections in Fort Wayne, Indiana

References

External links

City of Fort Wayne Mayor's Office

Fort Wayne, Indiana